The R326 road is a regional road in Ireland, located in County Roscommon.

References

Regional roads in the Republic of Ireland
Roads in County Roscommon